Suoranta is a Finnish surname. Notable people with the surname include:

Juha Suoranta (born 1966), Finnish social scientist
Simon Suoranta (born 1992), Finnish ice hockey player

Finnish-language surnames